Barnsley Metropolitan Borough Council is the local authority of the Metropolitan Borough of Barnsley in South Yorkshire, England. It is a metropolitan district council, one of four in South Yorkshire and one of 36 in the metropolitan counties of England, and provides the majority of local government services in Barnsley.

History
The current local authority was first elected in 1973, a year before formally coming into its powers and prior to the creation of the Metropolitan Borough of Barnsley on 1 April 1974. The council gained borough status, entitling it to be known as Barnsley Metropolitan Borough Council.

Political control

Since 1973, political control of the council has been held by the following parties:

References

Metropolitan district councils of England
Local authorities in South Yorkshire
Leader and cabinet executives
Local education authorities in England
Billing authorities in England
1973 establishments in England
Council